Khalifa Hassan is a jamoat in western Tajikistan. It is part of the city of Panjakent in Sughd Region. The jamoat has a total population of 14,728 (2015). It consists of 7 villages, including Zebon.

References

Populated places in Sughd Region
Jamoats of Tajikistan